Roy Arthur Adkins  (born 1951) and Lesley Adkins  (born 1955) are English writers and archaeologists. They are members of the Institute for Archaeologists and fellows of the Society of Antiquaries of London. They have both written several books.

Based in Devon, near Exeter, they devote much of their time to writing. Their first book was A Thesaurus of British Archaeology, better known by its paperback title of The Handbook of British Archaeology. They have written several other books on archaeological and historical themes, from detailed reference books to popular non-fiction. The latter includes The Keys of Egypt, an account of Champollion's successful deciphering of ancient Egyptian hieroglyphs. They have also pursued individual writing projects – Lesley wrote Empires of the Plain: Henry Rawlinson and the Lost Languages of Babylon, and Roy wrote Trafalgar: The Biography of a Battle (US title Nelson's Trafalgar).

Biography 
Roy was born and raised in Maidenhead, Berkshire, He was educated at University College, Cardiff, gaining a Bachelor of Arts degree in archaeology whilst spending vacations on digs mainly at the Roman town of Usk in south Wales. After obtaining his degree, he worked as a field archaeologist in Milton Keynes, and later at a Roman villa site at Beddington near Croydon with Lesley.

Lesley was born in 1955 in Eastbourne. She obtained degrees in archaeology, ancient history, and Latin at the University of Bristol, and her Master of Philosophy degree at the University of Surrey. After graduating she worked as an assistant archaeologist on excavations in Milton Keynes before meeting Roy and moving to South London.

They married in 1978.

They both worked as field archaeologists for the Museum of London and later became freelance archaeological consultants, authors, and editors. After 2000 they moved to Devon and began to write full-time.

Work 
Jack Tar: Life in Nelson's Navy
Trafalgar: The Biography of a Battle
The War for All the Oceans: From Nelson at the Nile to Napoleon at Waterloo
Empires of the Plain: Henry Rawlinson and the Lost Languages of Babylon
The Keys of Egypt: The Race to Read the Hieroglyphs
The Handbook of British Archaeology
Handbook to Life in Ancient Rome
Handbook to Life in Ancient Greece
The Little Book of Egyptian Hieroglyphs
Dictionary of Roman Religion
Introduction to the Romans
A Field Guide to Somerset Archaeology
Talking Archaeology: A Handbook for Lecturers and Organisers
Abandoned Places
An Introduction to Archaeology
Archaeological Illustration
Under the Sludge. Beddington Roman Villa
 Jane Austen's England
 When There Were Birds

Reception 

A review in Navy News stated that "Roy and Lesley Adkins possess that rare knack among historians: merging the academic with the narrative and providing a riveting read which also casts light where it is dark."

Popular culture 
Trafalgar: The Biography of a Battle made an appearance at Christmas in the comedy programme Peep Show (series 7 episode 5), when Mark (played by David Mitchell) receives a copy of the book as a present from his flatmate Jeremy (played by Robert Webb). "I heard you talking about it", comments Jeremy, to which Mark replies, "That's just tremendously thoughtful Jeremy".

References

External links 

 Authors' website
 Authors' Top 10 Nelson Books
 Jack Tar Readers Reviews

English archaeologists
Fellows of the Society of Antiquaries of London
Living people
Married couples
Writing duos
Year of birth missing (living people)